John Type (born c. 1972) is a Zimbabwean sculptor.

Type grew up in Chitungwiza, Zimbabwe and began work as an assistant to Kennedy Migeal in 1989.  After a year or so he began to work on his own. He has since mentored several artists himself, including Dudzai Mushawepwere and Godfrey Kennedy. Type's works are generally abstract in form.

John prefers to sculpt in abstract form and captures the grace and movement of each subject. Each piece will have a story to tell, which comes from experience and inspiration in his surrounding environment.

John believes he is gifted by God to create such art forms, as he is the only one in his family that is sculpting. John has an ability to use the natural and spiritual elements of stone to create works of art that are incredibly expressive of movement and formation. Most of Johns works are in private collections around the world, from Germany, Canada, Belgium, Holland, the U.S. and the UK.

General references
Biographical sketch
ZimSculpt

1972 births
Living people
Zimbabwean sculptors
20th-century sculptors
21st-century sculptors
People from Mashonaland East Province